Barry O'Driscoll (born 1990) is an Irish Gaelic footballer who plays for club side Nemo Rangers. He is a former member of the Cork senior football team. O'Driscoll usually lines out in the forwards.

Honours

University College Cork
Sigerson Cup: 2011

Nemo Rangers
Munster Senior Club Football Championship: 2007, 2010, 2017, 2019 (c)
Cork Senior Football Championship: 2007, 2008, 2010, 2015, 2017, 2019 (c)

Cork
Munster Senior Football Championship: 2012
National Football League: 2011, 2012
Munster Under-21 Football Championship: 2011
Munster Minor Football Championship: 2007

References

1990 births
Living people
Nemo Rangers Gaelic footballers
Cork inter-county Gaelic footballers